Tamagaki Gakunosuke IV (1784 – August 29, 1824) was a Japanese sumo wrestler from Minamitakaki, Nagasaki, Japan. His highest rank was ōzeki.

Career
He made a professional debut in 1806 and was promoted to the top makuuchi division in 1810. In April 1814, he was ranked at maegashira 1, but in the very next November 1814 tournament, he was ranked at ōzeki. The reason was that the banzuke (the sumo wrestlers' hierarchy) was changed to that based on real ability.

In June 1823, Tamagaki and Kashiwado were awarded yokozuna licences by the Gojo family. However, after Kashiwado rejected the licence, he also rejected his. In the next year, he died while being an active wrestler.

In the top makuuchi division, he achieved the best record in only four tournaments, but his win ratio finally reached .815. Rival Kashiwado won 16 tournaments, but he recorded the win ratio .810.

Top division record
The actual time the tournaments were held during the year in this period often varied.
 
 
    
    
  
 
    
    
  

    
    
  

    
    
  

    
    
  

    
    
  

    
    
  

    
    
  

    
    
  

    
    
  

    
    
  

    
    
  

    
    
  

    
    
  

    
  

*Championships for the best record in a tournament were not recognized or awarded before the 1909 summer tournament, and the unofficial championships above are historically conferred. For more information, see yūshō.

See also
List of past sumo wrestlers
Glossary of sumo terms

References

External links
 Tamagaki Gakunosuke Tournament results

1784 births
1824 deaths
Japanese sumo wrestlers
Ōzeki
Sumo people from Nagasaki Prefecture